Yakutiye is a central district of the province of Erzurum in Turkey. It has a population of 183,500 as of 2011.

References

External links 
Mayorship of Yakutiye (in Turkish)
Yakutiye District Municipality (in Turkish)

Erzurum Province
Districts of Erzurum Province